Yuli Teodorovich Dunsky (22 July 1922 in Moscow, Russia – 23 March 1982 in Moscow) was a Soviet screenwriter.

Most works made together with Valeri Frid.

Filmography

Writer 
 1984 And Then Came Bumbo
 1983 Every Tenth
 1983 Adventures of the Little Muk
 1982 The Story of the Voyages
 1981 Don't be Afraid, I'm with You
 1980 Air Crew
 1980 The Gadfly
 1979 The Adventures of Sherlock Holmes and Dr. Watson: Bloody Signature
 1979 The Adventures of Sherlock Holmes and Doctor Watson: Acquaintance
 1976 How Czar Peter the Great Married Off His Moor
 1976 Widows
 1974 High Title / For the Life on Earth
 1973 High Title / I, Shapovalov T. P.
 1971 The Shadow
 1970 Red Square
 1970 Shine, Shine, My Star
 1969 An Old, Old Tale
 1968 Bare et liv - historien om Fridtjof Nansen
 1968 Two Comrades Were Serving
 1965 Once Upon a Time There Was an Old Man and an Old Woman
 1964 An Unthinkable Story
 1962 Seven Nannies
 1962 Sixteenth Spring
 1960 The Same Age
 1957 The Case at Mine Eight

References

External links 
 

1922 births
1982 deaths
Soviet screenwriters
Male screenwriters
20th-century screenwriters
1982 suicides
Gerasimov Institute of Cinematography alumni
Gulag detainees
Suicides by firearm in the Soviet Union
Burials at Donskoye Cemetery
Soviet dramatists and playwrights